Junghuhnia chlamydospora is a species of poroid crust fungus in the family Steccherinaceae. The type specimen was collected in the Cockscomb Basin Wildlife Sanctuary in Belize, growing on a dead standing tree. The pore surface is yellowish to discoloured when fresh, later becoming blackish in parts when dry. The angular pores number 2 to 3 per millimetre. Its cylindrical spores measure 4–4.5 by 1.5–2 µm. It has finely encrusted skeletal hyphae, similar to the related Saint Lucian fungus J. carneola. The abundant chlamydospores, for which J. chlamydospora is named, measure 8–12 by 4–6 µm and are strongly dextrinoid. The fungus was described as new to science in 2007 by mycologist Leif Ryvarden.

References

Fungi described in 2007
Fungi of Central America
Steccherinaceae
Taxa named by Leif Ryvarden